The ruby-throated myzomela or red-throated myzomela (Myzomela eques) is a species of bird in the family Meliphagidae.
It is found in New Guinea.
Its natural habitat is subtropical or tropical moist lowland forests.

References

ruby-throated myzomela
Birds of New Guinea
ruby-throated myzomela
ruby-throated myzomela
Taxonomy articles created by Polbot